The 1995–96 Six Nations Tournament was the second and final playing of the Six Nations ice hockey Tournament. A total of 23 teams participated in the qualifying rounds, and the tournament was won by the Dragons de Rouen.

Qualification round

Alpine League

Atlantic League

Final
December 21, 1995, in Feldkirch : VEU Feldkirch - Dragons de Rouen 2-5
January 18, 1996, in Rouen : Dragons de Rouen - VEU Feldkirch 7-3

External links
1995-96 tournament on hockeyarchives.info

1995–96 in European ice hockey
Six Nations Tournament (ice hockey)